Thomas Kroth (born 26 August 1959) is a German former professional football who played as a midfielder.

Club career
Kroth won the DFB-Pokal in 1987 with Hamburger SV and in 1989 with Borussia Dortmund. He played in more than 250 West German top-flight matches.

International career
In 1985, he earned one cap for West Germany against Hungary.

Later career
Nowadays he is executive director of the agency PRO Profil, which merchandises and takes care of sportsmen.

Honours
Hamburger SV
 DFB-Pokal: 1986–87

Borussia Dortmund
 DFB-Pokal: 1988–89
 DFL-Supercup: 1989

References

External links
 
 
 
 Thomas Kroth at eintracht-archiv.de 

1959 births
German footballers
Germany international footballers
Germany under-21 international footballers
Association football midfielders
Living people
Kickers Offenbach players
1. FC Köln players
Eintracht Frankfurt players
Hamburger SV players
Borussia Dortmund players
Bundesliga players
2. Bundesliga players